Oberschleißheim is a municipality  in the district of Munich, in Bavaria, Germany. It is located 13 km north of Munich (centre). As of 2005 it had a population of 11,467.

Oberschleißheim is best known for the Schleissheim Palace and the Flugwerft Schleissheim next to the airport housing the airplane department of the German Museum. The airfield is also home to one of the five German Federal Police helicopter squadrons. Established in 1912, the airfield was the first in Bavaria.

During World War II, a subcamp of Dachau concentration camp was located here.

In the early 20th century, Schleißheim was home to author Waldemar Bonsels, who was inspired to write his "Biene Maja" by a gnarly tree in the woods nearby.

History

Schleißheim was first mentioned as “Sliusheim” in 785. The small church of St. Martin in Mallertshofen is a Romanesque church which still exists. In the Year 1315 the name of the village became “ Sleizheim”. Between 1616 and 1623  Duke Maximilan I. erected the Old Schloss. From 1701 to 1726 the New Schloss was built to the orders of Maximilian II Emanuel, including the Schloss Lustheim.

In the Mid 19th Century Oberschleißheim built a railway station with the name “Schleißheim” connecting to the Munich-Landshut railway route. This railway station was replaced by the “Oberschleißheim” station in 1972 due to the opening of the S-Bahn.

Starting in 1912, Oberschleissheim housed the first royal Bavarian airfield, which after World War I was used for civilian aviation and re-militarized in 1933. During the Third Reich, a satellite camp of the Dachau concentration camp was set up on the airfield. After World War II, first the United States Air Forces in Europe used the airfield (under the designation Airfield R.75), transferring it to the US Army in 1947 and abandoned in 1981. Today it serves as a civilian airfield as well as the base for the German Federal Police helicopter division.

Regatta Course Oberschleißheim

In 1972 an artificial canoe sprint and rowing venue was created in Oberschleißheim for the Munich Olympic Summer Games. The course is accessible through Munich's public transport and roading network. The stand has capacity for 9,500 spectators.

The venue host many events throughout the year including bungee jumping.

Flugwerft Schleissheim

The airfield and its historic buildings were constructed between 1912 and 1919 by the Königlich-Bayerische Fliegertruppen (Royal Bavarian Flying Corps). In the early 1990s the historic maintenance hangar was restored and enlarged to accommodate the Deutsches Museum's growing aviation collections. The Museum was opened on 18 September 1992.

The Museum has many aerospace exhibits.  These include various airplanes, helicopters, motors and turbines.

See also
Bundesamt für Strahlenschutz
Nordallianz
Regattastrecke Oberschleißheim
Rudolf Witzig

References

External links
 Schleißheim in alten Ansichten

Munich (district)